Glory Sound Prep is the second studio album by American singer-songwriter Jon Bellion. The album was released on November 9, 2018, through Visionary Music Group and Capitol Records. It was supported by three official singles: "Conversations with My Wife", "JT", and "Stupid Deep". The album was announced via Bellion's Twitter on October 10, 2018.

Background and release 
On January 25, 2018, Bellion teased a snippet of an upcoming song on an Instagram video. On April 16, Bellion began teasing his next album with 4 pictures captioned with "GSP". He later changed the name of his Instagram to the name of his touring group,  "Beautiful Mind".

On October 9, Bellion posted a photo to his social media accounts from "GSP Staff", stating: "Tomorrow, Headmaster Stormzy requests your presence for an orientation ceremony in the main atrium. Time: 3:00 pm EST." The following day he announced his second studio album Glory Sound Prep on his Twitter account, set to be released on November 9. On October 17, he released a preview on his social media accounts of the first single from the album, "Conversations with My Wife", which was released two days later. The following week, he released a preview on his social media accounts of the second promotional single, "JT", and released it on October 26. "Stupid Deep", the third promotional single from the album, was released on November 2.

In a 2019 Genius: For the Record Interview with Rob Markman, Jon explained that Glory Sound Prep is also the name of a production group composed of himself, Mark Williams, and Raul Cubina. He also explained that he decided not to heavily promote the album after getting so worn out from promoting his previous album, The Human Condition. Leaving the audience to sit with and digest the album, he believes, is very valuable.

Track listing

Personnel
Credits adapted from the album's liner notes.

Glory Sound Prep 
Jon Bellion - producer, lead vocals, MPC, synthesizer, programming, percussion, piano, whistle, string composer, sound design 
Raul Cubina - producer, sound design, synthesizer, programming, percussion, drums, background vocals, engineer, mixing engineer 
Mark Williams - producer, sound design, synthesizer, programming, percussion, guitar, bass guitar, mandolin, banjo, piano, ROLI, organ, background vocals, horn arrangement , string arrangement

Musicians 
Travis Mendes - lead vocals , background vocals 
B.Keyz - lead vocals 
RZA - lead vocals 
Christopher Sabat - lead vocals 
Quincy Jones - lead vocals 
Nylo - background vocals 
Daron Lameek - background vocals 
Sheldon-Ray Murray - background vocals 
Melissa McMillan - background vocals 
Samira Gibson - background vocals 
Camille Trczinski - background vocals 
John Splithoff - background vocals 
Schadrack Pierre - background vocals 
Christianne Jensen - background vocals 
JD McCrary - background vocals 
James McCrary - background vocals 
Ava Pagliarulo - background vocals 
Kate Sexton - background vocals 
Emma Sexton - background vocals 
Aaron "ys" Dales - bass guitar 
Mylon Hayde - MPC, programming , background vocals 
busbee - piano 
Homer Steinweiss - drums , percussion 
Stan Orlovsky - cello 
Leigh Stuart - cello 
Boris Deviatov - viola 
Eddy Malave - viola 
William Frampton - viola 
Alexander Abayev - violin 
Karen Dekker - violin 
Zach Brock - violin 
Ibanda Ruhumbika - sousaphone, tambourine 
David Guy - trumpet 
Michael Leonhart - trumpet , flugelhorn 
Frosty Lawson - trumpet , flugelhorn 
Ryan Svendsen - trumpet 
John Gibson - trombone 
Clark Gayton - trombone 
Frank Cohen - trombone 
Nick Grinder - trombone 
Richard Cannata - tenor sax , flute 
Ian Hendrickson-Smith - baritone sax

Production 
Aaron "ys" Dales - producer 
Mylon Hayde - producer 
busbee - producer 
Tuamie - producer 
John Arbuckle - engineer
Nylo - engineer 
Manny Marroquin - mixing engineer
Chris Galland - mixing engineer
Raul Torres - assistant mixing engineer
Jens Jungkurth - additional engineer 
Homer Steinweiss - assistant engineer 
Ben Dotson - post-production audio editing
Michelle Mancini - mastering
Mike Bozzi - mastering 
Chris Connors - strings composer , engraver 
David Ardinaryas Lojaya - album art
Recorded at Cove City Sound Studios — Glen Cove, New York
Recorded at Diamond Mine Recording — Long Island City, New York

Charts

References 

2018 albums
Jon Bellion albums
Albums produced by Jon Bellion